Luigi's Doghouse is the first album released by American stand-up comedian Jim Gaffigan. The album was released in 2001.

Track listing 
Bread
Don't Drink / Going Out to Dinner
Movies / Reading / Spelling
Girlfriend / Sex
Fired / Quit Smoking
Hot Pocket
Bottled Water / Mexican Food / TV
Manatee
Walking / Directions
Graffiti / Cab Approach
Jobs / Gym / Pope
Hated Being Single
Superman
Slob
See Our House / Kids

Jim Gaffigan live albums
Stand-up comedy albums
2001 live albums
2000s comedy albums